Roscrea GAA is a Tipperary GAA club which is located in County Tipperary, Ireland. Both hurling and Gaelic football are played in the "North Tipperary" divisional competitions. The club is centred on the town of Roscrea. The club's colours are red and white and they play at Páirc Naomh Cronáin (English: St. Cronan's Park). This was the venue for the 1949 All-Ireland Senior Camogie Championship Final.

History
Roscrea were founded in 1895. They were feared in the 1960s and 1970s for their hurling prowess but are now referred to as the "sleeping giants" of North Tipperary.

Hurling
Roscrea has been considered a strong club in North Tipperary for a long time. In 2017 Roscrea won a minor county title.

Honours
 All-Ireland Senior Club Hurling Championship Winners 1970-71
 Munster Senior Club Hurling Championship Winners 1969, 1970  Runners-Up 1972, 1980
 Tipperary Senior Hurling Championship Winners 1968, 1969, 1970, 1972, 1973, 1980  Runners-Up 1936, 1945, 1954, 1963, 1967, 1976, 1978, 1981, 1982, 1985    
 North Tipperary Senior Hurling Championship Winners 1936, 1937, 1939, 1941, 1942, 1945, 1949, 1954, 1963, 1967, 1968, 1969, 1970, 1971, 1980, 1982, 2004
 Tipperary Premier Intermediate Hurling Championship Winners 2022
 Tipperary Junior A Hurling Championship Winners 1982, 1986, 2015
 Tipperary Junior B Hurling Championship Winner 2012
 Tipperary Under-21 Hurling Championship Winners 1963, 1964, 1968, 1983, 1984
 Tipperary Minor A Hurling Championship Winners 1958, 1959, 1960, 1961, 1962, 1963, 1966, 1967, 1984 2017
 North Tipperary Junior A Hurling Championship (5) 1930, 1942, 1946, 1982, 1986
 North Tipperary Junior A Football Championship (3) 1918, 1925, 1926
 North Tipperary Junior B Hurling Championship (1) 2012
 North Tipperary Under-21 A Hurling Championship (7) 1961, 1962, 1963, 1964, 1968, 1983, 1984
 North Tipperary Minor A Hurling Championship (31) 1928, 1929, 1930, 1931, 1934, 1935, 1943, 1944, 1945, 1946, 1950, 1958, 1959, 1960, 1961, 1962, 1963, 1965, 1966, 1967, 2017 1968, 1974, 1975, 1976, 1980, 1983, 1984, 1988, 1999, 2001, 2003

Notable players
 Kieran Carey
 John Carroll
 Paul Delaney
 John Dillon
 Diarmaid FitzGerald
 Jack Gleeson
 Francis Loughnane
 Tadgh O'Connor
 Dinny Ryan
 Jack Ryan
 Mick Ryan
 Roger Ryan
 Mehall Scully

References

External links
Official Roscrea GAA Club website
Tipperary GAA site

Hurling clubs in County Tipperary
Gaelic games clubs in County Tipperary
Roscrea